José Ramos (born 29 March 1949) is a Cuban former wrestler who competed in the 1968 Summer Olympics, in the 1972 Summer Olympics, in the 1976 Summer Olympics, and in the 1980 Summer Olympics.

References

External links
 

1949 births
Living people
Olympic wrestlers of Cuba
Wrestlers at the 1968 Summer Olympics
Wrestlers at the 1972 Summer Olympics
Wrestlers at the 1976 Summer Olympics
Wrestlers at the 1980 Summer Olympics
Cuban male sport wrestlers
Pan American Games medalists in wrestling
Pan American Games silver medalists for Cuba
Wrestlers at the 1971 Pan American Games
Medalists at the 1971 Pan American Games
20th-century Cuban people
21st-century Cuban people